Manuel Guerra (born 30 October 1889, date of death unknown) was a Portuguese sports shooter. He competed at the 1924 Summer Olympics and the 1932 Summer Olympics.

References

External links
 

1889 births
Year of death missing
Portuguese male sport shooters
Olympic shooters of Portugal
Shooters at the 1924 Summer Olympics
Shooters at the 1932 Summer Olympics
People from Viseu
Sportspeople from Viseu District